Richard Chadwick, better known by the stage name Karen from Finance, is an Australian drag performer and a runner-up on the first season of RuPaul's Drag Race Down Under.

Career
Karen from Finance attended RuPaul's DragCon LA in 2017, 2018 and 2019. She also performed at the Austin International Drag Festival in 2017. She is an original member of the "Melbourne based cult queer cabaret 'YUMMY', a show which has garnered international acclaim for its subversive glamour and gone on to tour across Australia and the world", according to Jessi Lewis of the Star Observer.

Karen from Finance has debuted a stand-up show.

In October 2022, Karen from Finance announced the forthcoming release of debut studio album, Doing Time, scheduled for release on 2 December 2022. The album features the singles, "Out of Office", "Doing Time" and "It Should Have Been an Email".

Personal life
Chadwick lives in Melbourne.

Filmography

Television

Discography

Albums

References

Living people
Year of birth missing (living people)
People from Melbourne
Australian drag queens
RuPaul's Drag Race Down Under contestants